Korobkin (from коробка meaning box) is a Russian masculine surname, its feminine counterpart is Korobkina. It may refer to
Inna Korobkina (born 1981), Russian actress
Olga Korobkina (born 1989), Russian skeleton racer 
Valeri Korobkin (born 1984), Kazakhstani football player 
Vladyslav Korobkin (born 1983), Ukrainian football striker
Yelena Korobkina (born 1990), Russian middle-distance runner

Russian-language surnames